Grierson Reef; Sinh Ton Dong Island;  Mandarin , is a cay on the eastern part of the Union Banks of the Spratly Islands in the South China Sea. The island has been occupied by Vietnam since 1978. It is also claimed by China (PRC), the Philippines, Vietnam, and Taiwan (ROC).

See also
Spratly Islands dispute

References

External links
Asia Maritime Transparency Initiative Island Tracker

Islands of the Spratly Islands
Islands of Vietnam
Union Banks